Borisovsky (masculine), Borisovskaya (feminine), or Borisovskoye (neuter) may refer to:
Vadim Borisovsky (1900–1972), Russian/Soviet violist
Borisovsky District, a district of Belgorod Oblast, Russia
Borisovsky (rural locality) (Borisovskaya, Borisovskoye), name of several rural localities in Russia
Borisovsky Khotilovo, an air base in Tver Oblast, Russia